Cucullanidae is a family of parasitic nematodes, created by Cobbold in 1864.
It includes the following genera:

Cucullanus Müller, 1777
Dichelyne Jägerskiöld, 1902
Neocucullanus Travassos, Artigas & Pereira, 1928

References

Ascaridida
Parasitic nematodes of fish
Nematode families